Kluger may refer to:

People
(Kluger is a common Jewish surname of Yiddish origin)
 Daniel Kluger, Israeli writer
 Adam Kluger, American music and marketing executive 
 Irv Kluger, American jazz drummer
 Jeffrey Kluger, senior writer at TIME Magazine
 Richard Kluger, Pulitzer Prize-winning author and book publisher
 Shlomo Kluger (1783–1869), chief dayan and preacher of Brody, Galicia
 Steve Kluger (1952- ), American author and playwright
 Szymon Kluger (1925 — 2000), the last Jew in Oświęcim (Auschwitz), Poland

Other
 Toyota Highlander, an SUV, also known as Toyota Kluger

Jewish surnames